Armand Marrast (June 5, 1801, Saint-Gaudens–April 12, 1852, Paris) was a French politician and mayor of Paris.

See also 
 List of presidents of the National Assembly of France
 List of mayors of Paris

1801 births
1852 deaths
People from Saint-Gaudens, Haute-Garonne
Politicians from Occitania (administrative region)
Moderate Republicans (France)
Members of the 1848 Constituent Assembly